Ana María "Ani" Escribano López (born 2 December 1981) is a Spanish retired footballer who played as a centre back. A former Spain women's national football team international, she spent 19 years with first club FC Barcelona and one season with ÍBV in Iceland's Úrvalsdeild kvenna.

Club career

In her final season with Barcelona, she captained the team to the league and cup double. In September and October 2012 Escribano played in her first UEFA Women's Champions League matches, as Barcelona were thrashed 7–0 by Arsenal over two legs.

Escribano left Barcelona after 19 years in May 2013, signing for Icelandic club ÍBV. She scored twice in 12 league appearances for ÍBV. Escribano then decided to return to Spain, playing a season with Sant Vicenç, then joining Fontsanta Fatjó of the Preferente Femenina Catalana.

International career

Escribano was part of the Spanish national team who competed in the 2011 FIFA Women's World Cup qualifiers.

References

External links
Profile at UEFA.com
Ani, BDFutbol

Spanish women's footballers
Spanish expatriate footballers
1981 births
Living people
Spain women's international footballers
Footballers from Barcelona
FC Barcelona Femení players
Primera División (women) players
Spanish expatriate sportspeople in Iceland
Expatriate women's footballers in Iceland
Women's association football central defenders
Ana María Escribano
Sportswomen from Catalonia